Harsh Vardhan (1 December 1947 – 4 October 2016) was an Indian politician from Uttar Pradesh who entered politics with Socialist Party but later joined Congress. He was elected from Maharajganj constituency of Uttar Pradesh in 1989 and 2009.

Education and background
Harsh Vardhan, was  an alumnus of Lucknow Sainik School and held a B.A. degree from Lucknow University, Lucknow, Uttar Pradesh. He died after a short illness on 4 October 2016.

Family
His daughter  is Supriya Shrinate, who was executive editor with ET Now, the business channel of Times Television Network, before resigning to contest the 2019 Lok Sabha Elections from Maharajganj unsuccessfully and was later appointed as the INC spokesperson.

Posts held

See also
List of members of the 15th Lok Sabha of India

References

External links 

India MPs 2009–2014
2016 deaths
1947 births
Indian National Congress politicians
Janata Dal politicians
India MPs 1989–1991
Uttar Pradesh MLAs 1985–1989
Politicians from Agra
Lok Sabha members from Uttar Pradesh
United Progressive Alliance candidates in the 2014 Indian general election
Sainik School alumni
People from Maharajganj district